This is a list of international schools in Guangzhou, China:

 American International School of Guangzhou
 Canadian International School of Guangzhou
 Guangzhou Nanfang International School
 Clifford International School
 The British School of Guangzhou
 Japanese School of Guangzhou
 Guangzhou Korean School
 Utahloy International School of Guangzhou
 Huamei-Bond International College
Ulink College Guangzhou
Nansha College Preparatory Academy
Fettes College Guangzhou

References

 

Guangzhou
Guangzhou
Guangzhou
Guangzhou